Bert Harris was a cyclist.

Bert Harris may also refer to:
Bert Harris (footballer) (born 1931), English footballer
Bert J. Harris Jr. (1919–2019), American politician
Bert Harris (wrestler) (1916–1982), Australian freestyle wrestler

See also
Albert Harris (disambiguation)
Herbert Harris (disambiguation)
Robert Harris (disambiguation)
Bertie Harris (1884–?), South African long-distance runner